The Arsenal Ground is a multipurpose sports ground located in the town of Saint Anne, in Alderney (in Channel Island). This field is mostly used for football matches, and currently, the Alderney official football team and Alderney F.C. host their games at The Arsenal, both for Muratti Vase, or the Guernsey Priaulx League.This stadium has a maximum capacity of up to 1,500 people.

References

Football venues in Alderney